Halichondria panicea, commonly known as the breadcrumb sponge, is a species of sea sponge belonging to the family Halichondriidae. This is an abundant sponge of coastal areas of the North Atlantic and the Mediterranean Sea ranging from the intertidal zone to a recorded depth of over 550 m. It is also found in the intertidal zone of the coast of the northern part of the North Island of New Zealand. It is very tolerant of a wide range of coastal habitats, including strong currents, high salinity and exposure to powerful wave action. Its only requirement is a rocky substrate which can include small cobbles.

Morphology

Halichondria panicea occurs in a very wide range of forms and can be difficult to identify. Some forms have a granular surface which gives rise to the common name but sometimes the surface is smooth, even glassy. The surface is often marked with pores (oscula) which can extend into tubular "chimneys" in wave-sheltered habitats. The overall form is determined largely by the habitat: wave-exposed forms usually form thin widespread sheets but wave-sheltered forms often form massive encrustations up to 20 cm thick. This diversity has led to its being described as a new species 56 times (see below).

The colour is also variable. The "natural" colour is cream or grey: this is usually found in specimens from relatively deep water. However at shallower depths, the sponge is usually green due to symbiotic algae which live close to the surface of the sponge. At intermediate depths the sponge tends to be green in summer, cream or grey in winter. It smells like "exploded gunpowder".

Biology
Halichondria panicea is a suspension feeder feeding mainly on phytoplankton. For such a common species, relatively little is known about its reproduction: It appears to be a hermaphrodite and oogenesis has been reported as occurring in a very narrow timeband within a single population although exceptions have been observed.

Other names
When the World Register of Marine Species was created, it was discovered that no less than 56 Latin names had been assigned to this species over the years, because of confusion caused by the many different forms it might take.

References

Halichondrida
Animals described in 1766
Taxa named by Peter Simon Pallas